Moose Jaw County was a provincial electoral division  for the Legislative Assembly of the province of Saskatchewan, Canada. The district was created as "Moose Jaw" before the 1st Saskatchewan general election in 1905. The riding was abolished into the districts of Gravelbourg, Bengough, Notukeu-Willow Bunch, and Milestone before the 9th Saskatchewan general election in 1938. It was the constituency of Premier Charles Avery Dunning.

It is now part of the Thunder Creek, Moose Jaw Wakamow, and Wood River constituencies.

Members of the Legislative Assembly

Election results

|-

|Provincial Rights
|Samuel K. Rathwell
|align="right"|693
|align="right"|47.73%
|align="right"|–
|- bgcolor="white"
!align="left" colspan=3|Total
!align="right"|1,452
!align="right"|100.00%
!align="right"|

|-

|Provincial Rights
|Henry Dorrell
|align="right"|1,109
|align="right"|49.55%
|align="right"|+1.82
|- bgcolor="white"
!align="left" colspan=3|Total
!align="right"|2,238
!align="right"|100.00%
!align="right"|

|-

|Conservative
|Fred W. Green
|align="right"|622
|align="right"|39.00%
|align="right"|-10.55
|- bgcolor="white"
!align="left" colspan=3|Total
!align="right"|1,595
!align="right"|100.00%
!align="right"|

|-

|style="width: 130px"|Conservative
|John Edwin Chisholm
|align="right"|2,148
|align="right"|51.07%
|align="right"|+12.07

|- bgcolor="white"
!align="left" colspan=3|Total
!align="right"|4,206
!align="right"|100.00%
!align="right"|

|-

|Conservative
|John Edwin Chisholm
|align="right"|1,815
|align="right"|35.37%
|align="right"|-15.70
|- bgcolor="white"
!align="left" colspan=3|Total
!align="right"|5,131
!align="right"|100.00%
!align="right"|

|-

|- bgcolor="white"
!align="left" colspan=3|Total
!align="right"|Acclamation
!align="right"|

|-

|- bgcolor="white"
!align="left" colspan=3|Total
!align="right"|2,929
!align="right"|100.00%
!align="right"|

|-

|- bgcolor="white"
!align="left" colspan=3|Total
!align="right"|Acclamation
!align="right"|

|-

|style="width: 130px"|Conservative
|Sinclair Alexander Whittaker
|align="right"|2,381
|align="right"|50.95%
|align="right"|-

|- bgcolor="white"
!align="left" colspan=3|Total
!align="right"|4,673
!align="right"|100.00%
!align="right"|

|-

|Farmer-Labour
|Henry Milne
|align="right"|1,714
|align="right"|32.41%
|align="right"|+32.41

|Independent
|Sinclair Whittaker
|align="right"|1,075
|align="right"|20.32%
|align="right"|-30.63
|- bgcolor="white"
!align="left" colspan=3|Total
!align="right"|5,289
!align="right"|100.00%
!align="right"|

See also
Moose Jaw – Northwest Territories territorial electoral district (1870–1905).

Electoral district (Canada)
List of Saskatchewan provincial electoral districts
List of Saskatchewan general elections
List of political parties in Saskatchewan

References
 Saskatchewan Archives Board – Saskatchewan Election Results By Electoral Division

Moose Jaw
Former provincial electoral districts of Saskatchewan